This is a list article about '''sport in the Vatican City.

Multi-sport events
The Vatican City is not a member of the International Olympic Committee and is therefore not able to send a team to the Olympic Games. However athletes have represented the Vatican City in an unofficial or non-scoring capacity at some international multi-sport events.

Championships of the Small States of Europe

A team represented the Vatican City at the 2022 edition of the Championships of the Small States of Europe in Malta in a non-scoring manner.

Games of the Small States of Europe

A delegation from the Vatican City was present at the 2019 edition of the Games of the Small States of Europe in Montenegro, but were only allowed to observe. A team from the Vatican City were scheduled to compete officially at the 2021 edition through a partnership with the Italian Olympic Committee but the event was cancelled because of the COVID-19 pandemic. Vatican City is now expected to participate in the 2023 edition.

Mediterranean Games

One athlete represented the Vatican City at the 2022 edition of the Mediterranean Games in Algeria in a non-scoring manner.

Team sports

Football
The Vatican City is not a member of FIFA; however, representative men's and woman's national football teams exist and play friendly matches and in unofficial tournaments. A local football league, Vatican City Championship, was founded in 1972 and is made up of teams representing employees the different administrative departments in the Vatican.

Cricket
The Vatican City is not a member of the International Cricket Council; however, a representative national men's cricket team was formed in 2013.

Individual sports

Athletics
Vatican Athletics is the governing body for athletics in the Vatican City.

Cycling
Vatican Cycling became member of the International Cycling Union in September 2021.

Taekwondo
Vatican Taekwondo became a member of World Taekwondo in November 2021.

See also
Culture of Vatican City

References

Sport in Vatican City